The following is a list of events and statistics from the 2009–2010 Maine Black Bears women's ice hockey season. The Black Bears are an ice hockey team which represent the University of Maine. The head coach is Dan Lichterman. Assisting him are Karine Senecal, Sara Simard, and Meghan MacDonald.

Offseason
July 16: The 2009 Battle of the Bears trophy goes to the Women's Ice Hockey team. They topped all other Maine Black Bears teams with 2,594 points. The women's ice hockey team earned the win by earning the highest GPA of all sports teams for the academic year. The team was also awarded the Black Bear Citizenship Award this spring for their commitment to service throughout the year.
July 27: Head coach Dan Lichterman has announced that the program has received an additional commitment for the 2009–10 season. Darcia Leimgruber will join the Black Bears in the fall of 2009. Leimgruber is a 5-foot 3-inch forward from Basel, Switzerland.

Regular season
December: Jenna Ouellette played in four games and accumulated nine points (5 goals, 4 assists) leading the Black Bears to three victories. She recorded a point in all four games and notched multiple points in three games. She played a part in nine of the 12 Black Bear goals in December and assisted on all four goals vs. Vermont on Dec. 4. She scored the game-winning goal while on the power play in a 1–0 win over Vermont (12/5). In addition, she notched a pair of goals against Union (12/11) and another pair in the finale at Union (12/12).
January 26: Maine freshman forward Darcia Leimgruber (Basel, Switzerland) has been named to the Team Switzerland Olympic Women's Ice Hockey team that will represent Switzerland at the 2010 Winter Olympic Games in Vancouver, B.C. Leimgruber is the third Black Bear to have ties to the Women's Ice Hockey Olympic games. Raffi Wolf represented the Black Bears when she played on Team Germany at the 2002 games in Salt Lake City as well as the 2006 Torino games. Former club hockey student-athlete, Stacey Livingston, officiated the gold medal game at the 1998 Olympics in Nagano, Japan.

Standings

Roster

Schedule

Player stats

Skaters

Goaltenders

Postseason

NCAA hockey tournament

Awards and honors
Abby Barton, Hockey East Association Academic All-Star Team
 Brittany Ott, 2010 WHEA All-Rookie Team
 Jenna Ouellette – Maine, WHEA Player of the Month, December 2009
Jenna Ouellette, Hockey East Association Academic All-Star Team
 Amy Stech, Runner up, Hockey East Sportsmanship Award

Hockey East all-academic team
Abby Barton
Jenna Ouellette
Amy Stech
Danielle Cyr
Jennie Gallo
Jessica Bond
Candice Currier
Melissa Gagnon
Ashley Norum
Dawn Sullivan
Kylie Smith
Chloe Tinker

References

External links
Official site

Maine Black Bears women's ice hockey seasons
Maine
Black
Black